Helmont is the surname of the following people:

 Jan Baptist van Helmont (1580–1644) was an early modern period Flemish chemist, physiologist, and physician.
 Franciscus Mercurius van Helmont (d.1698) was his son, who made his work famous, though he was imprisoned for publishing his works
 Mattheus van Helmont (1623 – after 1685), was a Flemish Baroque painter and relative of the former, who became known for his genre paintings featuring alchemists.
 Zeger Jacob van Helmont (1683–1726), was a relative of the former, and himself an 18th-century painter from the Southern Netherlands specialized in historical allegories.

Dutch-language surnames